Howard Sidney Vandersea (born September 12, 1941) is a former American football player and coach. He served as the head football coach at Springfield College in Springfield, Massachusetts from 1976 to 1983 and at Bowdoin College from 1984 to 1999, compiling a career college football coaching record of 88–114–3. Vandersea played college football at Bates College.

References

1941 births
Living people
American football linebackers
American football offensive tackles
Bates Bobcats football players
Brown Bears football coaches
Bowdoin Polar Bears football coaches
Springfield Pride football coaches
People from Northbridge, Massachusetts
Players of American football from Massachusetts
Sportspeople from Worcester County, Massachusetts